George H. Crosby Manitou State Park is a state park of Minnesota, USA, located between Tettegouche State Park and Temperance River State Park on the North Shore of Lake Superior, near the communities of Little Marais and Finland. It is situated on the Manitou River and was intentionally left largely undeveloped.

History
The original  of land on which this park sits were donated by George H. Crosby in 1955. The park was named both after Crosby and the river which it contains, the Manitou River. A decision was made to keep the park largely undeveloped, and thus it contains only backpacking campsites and not a traditional campground. It was the first backpacking campground in the state of Minnesota, and remains restricted to backpackers to this day.

Wildlife 
The park contains numerous wildlife species such as timber wolf, black bear, moose, peregrine falcon, golden eagle, raccoon, Canadian lynx, kestrel, snowshoe hare, beaver,  bald eagle, white-tailed deer, hawk, fisher, marten, grouse, red squirrel, Canada jay, and species of bats.

Landscape
Because it is undeveloped, Crosby Manitou State Park contains many undisturbed miles of fir, cedar, spruce, and northern hardwoods. The river itself has cataracts to the north of the park, and Bensen Lake sits across the southwest ridge of the river valley.

References

External links

 George H. Crosby Manitou State Park

1955 establishments in Minnesota
Protected areas established in 1955
Protected areas of Lake County, Minnesota
State parks of Minnesota